WFOV-LP, 92.1 FM, (branded "Our Voices Radio") is a low power radio station with a variety format licensed to Flint Odyssey House, Inc., a sober living facility in Flint, Michigan, and operated in association with Spectacle Productions. It features a mix of adult hits music, original and syndicated talk shows, and local public affairs programming including Flint City Council, Genesee County Commission, and Flint school board meetings. It calls itself a public access station, brokering time to local talent for a nominal fee, including former WKUF-LP personality Tom Sumner.

References

External links
 The Tom Sumner Program Official Site - local talk show that airs on WFOV-LP
 

FOV-LP
FOV-LP
Radio stations established in 2016
2016 establishments in Michigan
Community radio stations in the United States